Gymnographopsis is a genus of lichen-forming fungi in the family Graphidaceae. It was circumscribed by American lichenologist Carroll William Dodge in 1967, with Gymnographopsis chilena assigned as the type species.

Species
Gymnographopsis cerei 
Gymnographopsis chilena 
Gymnographopsis corticicola 
Gymnographopsis follmannii 
Gymnographopsis koreaiensis 
Gymnographopsis latispora

References

Ostropales
Lichen genera
Ostropales genera
Taxa named by Carroll William Dodge
Taxa described in 1967